"Inmortal" is the second single from the fifth studio album A las cinco en el Astoria by the Spanish pop/rock group La Oreja de Van Gogh. It was confirmed to be the second single by the group on 16 October. It was officially released on early November.

Music video

The videoclip was filmed in Valparaíso, Chile. It begins with Leire singing under a colourful house with a red umbrella. Later the other members of the band appears with black umbrellas, and they start to play the song together. At the end of the video they appear on a Pacific beach with their umbrellas again. It's a very naive video that shows beautiful places of Chile.

It was released on 24 November 2008.

Chart performance

2008 singles
2008 songs
Sony BMG singles
La Oreja de Van Gogh songs